Italian House (also known as the Italian Kamienica, Montelupi House or Montelupi Kamienica) is a kamienica building in Main Square, Kraków, Poland. It was built in the 16th century by Sebastian Montelupi, and served as a headquarters of the Polish Post, and one of the centers of Italian culture in Kraków.  When it was operating as a postal centre stagecoaches to Venice departed from here.

The building is classified as a monument.

References

Buildings and structures in Kraków